Timothy Rees (born 24 July 1980) is a Canadian judoka and academic who represented Canada in Judo at the 2012 Paralympics in the -100 kg category. He was eliminated in the first round by Britain's Joe Ingram.

Rees won bronze at the 2011 Parapan American Games in the under -100 kg category. He holds a PhD in applied mathematics and worked as a postdoctoral research fellow at the University of Victoria.  In 2015 he began work in industry, and he currently serves as the Chief Scientist at Allsalt Maritime Corporation.

See also
Judo in Canada
List of Canadian judoka

References

External links

Video
Television news story about Tim Rees (CHEK News on YouTube)

1980 births
Living people
Canadian male judoka
Paralympic judoka of Canada
Judoka at the 2012 Summer Paralympics
Medalists at the 2011 Parapan American Games